The Hungarian Grand Prix is a motor racing event held annually in Mogyoród. Since 1986, the race has been a round of the FIA Formula One World Championship.

History

Origins
The first Hungarian Grand Prix was held on 21 June 1936 over a  track laid out in Népliget, a park in Budapest. The Mercedes-Benz, Auto Union, and the Alfa Romeo-equipped Ferrari teams all sent three cars and the event drew a very large crowd. However, politics and the ensuing war meant the end of Grand Prix motor racing in the country for fifty years.

Hungaroring
A major coup by Bernie Ecclestone, the 1986 Hungarian Grand Prix was the first Formula One race to take place behind the Iron Curtain. Held at the twisty Hungaroring in Mogyoród near Budapest, the race has been a mainstay of the racing calendar ever since.  It was the only current Grand Prix venue that had never seen a wet race up until the 2006 Hungarian Grand Prix. The first Grand Prix saw 200,000 people spectating, although tickets were expensive at the time.  Today, the support is still very enthusiastic, particularly from Finns.

Due to the nature of the track, narrow, twisty and often dusty because of under-use, the Hungarian Grand Prix is associated with processional races, with sometimes many cars following one another, unable to pass. Thierry Boutsen demonstrated this in 1990, keeping his slower Williams car in front of championship leader Ayrton Senna, unable to find a way by. Pit strategy is often crucial; in 1998, Michael Schumacher's Ferrari team changed his strategy mid-race before Schumacher built up a winning margin after all the stops had been made. Passing is a rarity here, although the 1989 race saw a bullish performance from Nigel Mansell in the Ferrari, who started from 12th on the grid and passed car after car, finally taking the lead when Ayrton Senna was baulked by a slower runner. The circuit was modified slightly in 2003 in an attempt to allow more passing.

Other notable occasions in Budapest include first Grand Prix wins for Damon Hill (in 1993), Fernando Alonso (in 2003, the first Grand Prix winner from Spain, and the youngest ever Grand Prix winner at the time), Jenson Button (in an incident-packed race in 2006), Heikki Kovalainen (in 2008, who also became the 100th winner of a World Championship race), and Esteban Ocon (in 2021). In 1997, Damon Hill came close to winning in the technically inferior Arrows-Yamaha, but his car lost drive on the last lap causing him to coast in second place. In 2014, Lewis Hamilton finished in third, six seconds behind winner Daniel Ricciardo, despite starting the race from the pit lane.

In 2001, Michael Schumacher equalled Alain Prost's then record 51 Grand Prix wins at the Hungaroring, a drive that secured his fourth Drivers' Championship, which also matched Prost's career tally.

The 2006 Grand Prix was the first to be held here in wet conditions. Button took his first victory from 14th place on the grid.

In 2020, Lewis Hamilton won the Hungarian Grand Prix for an eighth time, equalling the most times a driver had won the same Grand Prix (sharing the record with Michael Schumacher who won the French Grand Prix eight times). The following year proved to be a memorable Hungarian Grand Prix; Mercedes' Valtteri Bottas was involved in a first-lap incident under wet conditions that took out multiple cars, including Max Verstappen, Lando Norris, Lance Stroll, and Sergio Pérez, along with Charles Leclerc and Daniel Ricciardo; Ricciardo and Verstappen managed to finish the race while the other drivers involved in Bottas' crash all retired. Following the resulting red flag, after which race leader Hamilton pitted for intermediates, making him the only car to start on the grid as the other drivers all started from the pits, Alpine's Esteban Ocon ended up leading the majority of the race, going on to take Team Enstone's first victory since 2014; Hamilton finished second after Sebastian Vettel was disqualified due to an insufficient fuel sample. The 2022 edition was won by Verstappen.

At the 2013 Hungarian Grand Prix, it was confirmed that Hungary would continue to host a Formula One race until 2021. The track was completely resurfaced for the first time in early 2016, and it was announced the Grand Prix's deal was extended for a further 5 years, until 2026.
In 2020 the contract was also extended one year further to 2027.

Winners of the Hungarian Grand Prix

Repeat winners (drivers)
Drivers in bold are competing in the Formula One championship in the current season.

Repeat winners (constructors)
Teams in bold are competing in the Formula One championship in the current season.

Repeat winners (engine manufacturers)
Manufacturers in bold are competing in the Formula One championship in the current season.

* Between 1999 and 2005 built by Ilmor, funded by Mercedes

By year

A pink background indicates an event which was not part of the Formula One World Championship.

References

External links 

 Official Ticket Agency of the Hungarian Formula One Grand Prix

 
Pre-World Championship Grands Prix
Formula One Grands Prix
National Grands Prix
1936 establishments in Hungary
Recurring sporting events established in 1936